Stemmle is a surname. Notable people with the surname include:

Brian Stemmle (born 1966), Canadian skier
Karen Stemmle (born 1964), Canadian skier
Michael Stemmle (born 1967), American computer game writer, designer, and director 
Robert A. Stemmle (1903–1974), German screenwriter and film director